The 1987–88 Purdue Boilermakers men's basketball team represented Purdue University during the 1987–88 college basketball season. Led by head coach Gene Keady, the team won the Big Ten Conference championship by a 3-game margin. The Boilermakers earned the No. 1 seed in the Midwest Region of the NCAA tournament and advanced to the Sweet 16, finishing the season with a 29–4 record (16–2 Big Ten).

Roster

Schedule and results

|-
!colspan=9 style=|Non-Conference Regular Season

|-
!colspan=9 style=|Big Ten Regular Season

|-
!colspan=9 style=| NCAA Tournament

NCAA basketball tournament

During the 1988 NCAA Division I men's basketball tournament, Purdue qualified for the Sweet Sixteen, where they lost to Kansas State.

Midwest
Purdue (#1 seed) 94, Fairleigh Dickinson (#16 seed) 79
Purdue 100, Memphis (#9 seed) 73
Kansas State (#4 seed) 73, Purdue 70

Rankings

Awards and honors
Gene Keady – Big Ten Coach of the Year

Team players drafted into the NBA

References

Purdue Boilermarkers
Purdue
Purdue Boilermakers men's basketball seasons
Purdue Boilermakers men's basketball
Purdue Boilermakers men's basketball